The Nakajima B6N Tenzan ("Heavenly Mountain", Allied reporting name: "Jill") was the Imperial Japanese Navy's standard carrier-borne torpedo bomber during the final years of World War II and the successor to the B5N "Kate". Due to its protracted development, a shortage of experienced pilots and the United States Navy's achievement of air superiority by the time of its introduction, the B6N was never able to fully demonstrate its combat potential.

Design and development

The B5N carrier torpedo-bomber's weaknesses had shown themselves early in the Second Sino-Japanese War and, as well as updating that aircraft, the Imperial Japanese Navy began seeking a faster longer-ranged replacement. In December 1939 it issued a specification to Nakajima for a Navy Experimental 14-Shi Carrier Attack Aircraft capable of carrying the same external weapons load as the B5N. The new plane was to carry a crew of three (pilot, navigator/bombardier and radio operator/gunner) and be of low wing, cantilevered, all-metal construction (though control surfaces were fabric-covered).

The Navy had requested installation of the proven Mitsubishi Kasei engine as the B6N's powerplant but Engineer Kenichi Matsumara insisted on using Nakajima's new  Mamori 11 14-cylinder air-cooled radial due to its lower fuel consumption and greater adaptability. This became an unfortunate choice as the Mamori engine was plagued with mechanical defects and never achieved its expected power rating.

This latter restriction accounted for the B6N's distinctive swept-forward tail fin and rudder. In order to lessen increased wingloading due to the heavier powerplant, Fowler flaps were installed which could be extended beyond the wing's trailing edge. These were normally lowered to an angle of 20 degrees during take-off and 38 degrees when landing. Despite the use of these flaps, however, the B6N had a much higher stall speed than its predecessor.

The prototype B6N1 made its maiden flight on 14 March 1941. Following continued testing, however, several problems became evident. In particular, the aircraft exhibited an alarming tendency to roll while in flight, the cause of which was traced to the extreme torque developed by the four-bladed propeller. To compensate, the aircraft's tail fin was thinned down and moved 2 degrees ten minutes to port. This modification greatly improved the plane's handling characteristics.

The B6N1's Mamori 11 engine was found prone to severe vibrations and overheating at certain speeds and was at first judged too unreliable (an important consideration given that the plane was expected to fly long distances over open water). Following a series of modifications, though, the engine's performance was finally deemed promising enough that carrier acceptance trials were begun at the end of 1942. Subsequent test flights conducted aboard the carriers Ryuho and Zuikaku indicated the need to strengthen the tail hook mounting on the plane's fuselage. Some attempts were also made to use RATOG (rocket-assisted take-off gear) units on several B6N1s in order to qualify the aircraft for use on smaller carriers but the results were unsatisfactory.

The B6N1 was officially approved for production status in early 1943 and given the designation Navy Carrier Attack Aircraft Tenzan Model 11. Modifications based on testing of the initial prototypes included: the addition of a flexible Type 92 machine gun in a ventral tunnel at the rear of the cockpit (in addition to the standard rear-firing Type 92), and a 7.7mm Type 97 machine-gun to the port wing (the latter was eventually deleted after the seventieth production aircraft); angling the torpedo mounting rack 2 degrees downward and adding torpedo stabilization plates to prevent the torpedo from bouncing during low-altitude release; strengthening of the main landing gear. A proposal by the designers to replace the B6N1's unprotected fuel tanks with self-sealing ones would have resulted in a 30% drop in fuel capacity, a loss in range the Navy decided was unacceptable.

After only 133 B6N1s had been produced by July 1943, the Japanese Ministry of Munitions ordered Nakajima to halt manufacture of the Mamori 11 engine in order that the Navy reduce the number of different engines then in use. Pending availability of the 18-cylinder Nakajima Homare engine, Nakajima was asked to substitute the  Mitsubishi MK4T Kasei 25 engine on the B6N1 airframe, the very engine the Navy had originally requested them to use. As the Mamori 11 and Kasei 25 were similar in size, installation was relatively straightforward, requiring only that the nose be extended to maintain the aircraft's center of gravity and minor alterations to the oil cooler and air intakes on the engine cowling. A smaller  diameter four-bladed propeller and shorter spinner were also installed at this time, resulting in a small weight-savings, and the retractable tailwheel was fixed permanently in the down position. Finally, the single exhaust stacks on either side of the engine cowling were replaced with multiple smaller stubs to reduce glare at night and to supply a minor amount of forward thrust. The resulting modification was designated Navy Carrier Attack Aircraft Tenzan Model 12 or B6N2.

Starting in the fall of 1943, one of every three B6N2s manufactured was equipped with 3-Shiki Type 3 air-to-surface radar for detecting enemy ships. Yagi antennas were installed along the wing leading edges and also protruded from the sides of the rear fuselage.

A final version of the aircraft, designated B6N3 Model 13, was planned for land-based use as, by this point in the war, all of Japan's large carriers had been sunk and those few smaller ones remaining lacked catapults for launching heavier carrier-borne aircraft like the B6N. Changes included installation of a Kasei Model 25c engine, a more streamlined engine cowling and crew canopy, strengthening of the main landing gear, a retractable tail wheel and removal of the tail hook. Two B6N3 prototypes were completed but Japan surrendered before this variant could be put into production.

By war's end in August 1945, Nakajima had completed a total of 1,268 B6Ns (almost all of them B6N2s) at its plants in Okawa in the Gumma district and at Aichi in the Handa district. Production never exceeded more than 90 planes per month.

Operational history

The B6N Tenzan began reaching front-line units in August 1943 in small numbers. The intent was to gradually replace all of the B5N Kate torpedo bombers then operating aboard the carriers of the Third Fleet at Truk Atoll in the Caroline Islands. However, the B6Ns were prematurely committed to battle when increased Allied naval activity in the Solomon Islands indicated a likely invasion at Bougainville. In response to this threat, the IJN initiated Operation Ro. This involved reinforcing land-based air units at Rabaul with 173 carrier aircraft from First Carrier Division (Zuikaku, Shokaku and  Zuiho), including forty B6Ns. These aircraft were flown from Truk to Rabaul between 28 October and 1 November.

On 5 November fourteen B6N1s, escorted by four A6M Zero fighters, were sent to attack American shipping anchored off Bougainville. Four B6N1s were lost and no hits were scored, returning Japanese pilots claimed to have sunk one large and one medium carrier, two heavy cruisers and two other cruisers or large destroyers.

Additional attacks on 8 November and 11 November, suffered heavy losses, with only 52 of the original 173 planes from the First Carrier Division making it back to Truk on 13 November, among them, just six B6N1 Tenzan'''s out of the forty committed.

On 19 June 1944, the B6N made its carrier-borne combat debut at The Battle of the Philippine Sea, operating in an environment where the U.S. Navy had virtually complete air superiority. Subsequently, it failed to inflict any damage whilst taking heavy losses from the U.S. Navy's new F6F Hellcat fighter.

By this point, small improvements in the B6N's performance were amongst the least of the Japanese Navy's problems. When the new model became available in mid-1944, Japan had already lost most of its large carriers and became desperately short of experienced pilots. Therefore, the vast majority of B6N2 operations took place from land bases and failed to achieve any major successes. The planes were extensively used in the Battle of Okinawa where they were also used for kamikaze missions for the first time.

Variants

B6N1 : Prototypes - Engine Nakajima NK7A Mamori 11 of 1,394 kW (1,870 hp), four-blade propeller. Two examples built.
B6N1 Tenzan Navy Carrier Based-Attack Bomber, Model 11: First series model. 133 built (work number 1–133).
B6N2 Model 12: Main production model, featured Mitsubishi MK4T Kasei 25 of 1,380 kW (1,850 hp). 1,131 built as B6N2/B6N2a (work number 134–750, 753–1,266).
B6N2a Model 12A: Revised dorsal armament. 7.7 mm (.303 in) Type 92 machine gun, replaced with one 13 mm Type 2 machine gun.
B6N3 Model 13 Prototypes: Engine Mitsubishi MK4T-C Kasei 25c of 1,380 kW (1,850 hp). Modified landing gear for operating from land bases; two built (work number 751–752).Total Production (all versions): 1,268 examples.

Survivors
B6N2 c/n 5350 remains in existence and it is stored at the National Air and Space Museum's Paul E. Garber Preservation, Restoration, and Storage Facility in Suitland, Maryland. It is currently disassembled. It was formerly displayed intact at Naval Air Station Joint Reserve Base Willow Grove in Horsham Township, Pennsylvania until it was acquired by the National Air and Space Museum in 1981.

 Operators 

 Imperial Japanese Navy
Aircraft carrierShōkakuZuikakuTaihōJun'yōHiyōRyūhōChitoseChiyodaZuihōNaval Air Group
Himeji Kōkūtai
Hyakurihara Kōkūtai
Kushira Kōkūtai
Sunosaki Kōkūtai
Suzuka Kōkūtai
Taiwan Kōkūtai
Tateyama Kōkūtai
Taura Kōkūtai
Usa Kōkūtai
Yokosuka Kōkūtai
131st Kōkūtai
210th Kōkūtai
331st Kōkūtai
501st Kōkūtai
531st Kōkūtai
551st Kōkūtai
553rd Kōkūtai
582nd Kōkūtai
601st Kōkūtai
634th Kōkūtai
652nd Kōkūtai
653rd Kōkūtai
701st Kōkūtai
705th Kōkūtai
752nd Kōkūtai
761st Kōkūtai
762nd Kōkūtai
765th Kōkūtai
901st Kōkūtai
903rd Kōkūtai
931st Kōkūtai
951st Kōkūtai
1001st Kōkūtai
Aerial Squadron
Attack 251st Hikōtai
Attack 252nd Hikōtai
Attack 253rd Hikōtai
Attack 254th Hikōtai
Attack 256th Hikōtai
Attack 262nd Hikōtai
Attack 263rd Hikōtai
Kamikaze
Kikusui-Tenzan group
Kikusui-Ten'ō group
Kikusui-Raiō group
Mitate group No. 2
Mitate group No. 3
Kiichi group
 

Use by Indonesia guerrilla Forces

Specifications (Nakajima B6N2)

See also

References

Notes

Bibliography

Francillon, René J. Imperial Japanese Navy Bombers of World War Two. Windsor, Berkshire, UK: Hylton Lacy Publishers Ltd., 1969. .
Francillon, R. J. Japanese Aircraft of the Pacific War. London: Putnam, 1970. .
Francillon, René J. Japanese Aircraft of the Pacific War. London: Putnam & Company Ltd., 1979. .
Francillon, René J. Japanese Carrier Air groups 1941-45. London: Osprey Publishing Ltd., 1979. .
 Gunston, Bill. Military Aviation Library World War II: Japanese & Italian Aircraft. Salamander Books Ltd., 1985. .
 Mondey, David. Concise Guide to Axis Aircraft of World War II. Temple Press, 1984. .
Thorpe, Donald W. Japanese Naval Air Force Camouflage and Markings World War II. Fallbrook, California; Aero Publishers Inc., 1977. . (pbk.) . (hc.)
Tillman, Barrett. Clash of the Carriers. New American Library, 2005. 
Wieliczko, Leszek A. and Argyropoulos, Peter. (transl.) Nakajima B6N "Tenzan" (Famous Airplanes 3) (Bi-lingual Polish/English). Lublin, Poland: Kagero, 2003. .
The Maru Mechanic No. 30 Nakajima carrier torpedo bomber "Tenzan" B6N'', Ushio Shobō (Japan), September 1981

External links

 Asahi museum prints

Carrier-based aircraft
B06N, Nakajima
B6N
B06N
Single-engined tractor aircraft
Low-wing aircraft
Aircraft first flown in 1941